George Taylor may refer to:

Military 
George Taylor (Alamo defender) (c. 1816–1836), soldier in Texas army, died in the Battle of the Alamo
George Taylor (British Army officer) (1905–1994), served in World War II, the Korean War, and the Mau Mau campaign
George Taylor (Medal of Honor) (1830–1893), American Civil War sailor and Medal of Honor recipient
George A. Taylor (1899–1969), American army officer at D-Day invasion, Battle of Normandy
George P. Taylor (born 1953), American Air Force Surgeon General
George W. Taylor (general) (1808–1862), American Civil War general, Army of the Potomac

Politics 
George Taylor (Canadian politician) (1840–1919), Canadian House of Commons member
George Taylor (Pennsylvania politician) (c. 1716–1781), signer of the U.S. Declaration of Independence
George Taylor (New York Representative) (1820–1894), American congressman from New York
George Taylor (Connecticut politician) (1802–1881), politician and physician
George E. Taylor (Michigan politician) (1838–1903), Michigan politician and judge
George Edwin Taylor (1857–1925), National Negro Liberty Party candidate for president of the United States, 1904
George H. Taylor (New York assemblyman), member of the 85th New York State Legislature
George H. Taylor (New York state senator), member of the 144th New York State Legislature
George L. Taylor (1842–?), physician and political figure in New Brunswick, Canada
George Sylvester Taylor (1822–1910), American Massachusetts state senator
George W. Taylor (Alabama politician) (1849–1932), American congressman from Alabama
George W. Taylor (Wisconsin politician) (1855–1931), American politician in Wisconsin
George William Taylor (born 1937), Canadian Solicitor General
George Taylor (Australian politician) (1861–1935), Australian labour leader and member of the Legislative Assembly of Western Australia
George Cuthbert Taylor (1886–1957), member of the Queensland Legislative Assembly

Sports 
George Taylor (boxer), mid-eighteenth century English boxer
George Taylor (manager) (1853–1911), American baseball manager
George Taylor (first baseman) (1869–?), Negro leagues first baseman
George Taylor (Australian rules footballer) (1876–1953), Australian rules footballer who played with South Melbourne
George Taylor (rugby league), rugby league footballer of the 1900s, 1910s and 1920s
George Taylor (footballer, born 1900) (1900–1982), played in the Football League for Brentford and Millwall
George Taylor (footballer, born 1901), English footballer
George Taylor (footballer, born 1907) (1907–?), English football outside right, who played for Coventry City F.C. in the 1930s
George Taylor (cricketer) (1909–1986), English cricket player
George Taylor (footballer, born 1909) (1909–?), English football left half
George Taylor (footballer, born 1915) (1915–1982), Scottish footballer, played for Aberdeen and Plymouth Argyle
George Taylor (footballer, born 1920) (1920–1983), English football goalkeeper, played for West Ham United
George Taylor (footballer, born 1948), Scottish footballer, played for Grimsby Town
George Taylor (rugby union) (born 1996), Scottish former rugby union player

Academics
George E. Taylor (historian) (1905–2000), China scholar, University of Washington professor
George Francis Taylor (died 2011), historian and archeologist at the American University of Beirut.
George H. Taylor (meteorologist) (born 1947), former director of the Oregon Climate Service at Oregon State University
George Pritchard Taylor (1854–?), grammarian
George Rogers Taylor (1895–1983), American economic historian of the early republic
George Watson-Taylor (1771–1841), British collector
George W. Taylor (professor) (1901–1972), American academic and labor mediator

Others 
George Taylor (artist) (1914–1996), English commercial artist
Sir George Taylor (botanist) (1904–1993), British botanist, from 1956 to 1971 director of the Royal Botanic Gardens, Kew
George Taylor (gardener) (1803–1891), introduced celery to the United States
George A. Taylor (bishop), American prelate
Tony Taylor (GC) (George Anthony Morgan Taylor, 1917–1972), Australian recipient of the George Cross   
George Augustine Taylor (1872–1928), Australian artist and journalist
George Keith Taylor (1769–1815), U.S. federal judge
George Ledwell Taylor (1788–1873), English architect
George Caldwell Taylor (1885–1952), U.S. federal judge
George Taylor (priest) (died 1811), Anglican priest
G. I. Taylor (George Ingram Taylor, 1886–1975), British physicist
George H. Taylor (physician) (1821–1896),  American physician and inventor
George Taylor (DC Comics), fictional character in the DC Comics universe, chief editor of the Daily Star
Taylor (Planet of the Apes), Colonel George Taylor, fictional hero of the first two films of the original Planet of the Apes series played by Charlton Heston

See also
Taylor (disambiguation)
List of people with surname Taylor